Juan Mendoza (1917–1978), also known as El Tariácuri, was a Mexican singer of the Mariachi genre, a folkloric-regional music of Mexico. He also participated in films in the 60s. Mendoza was part of the "Trio Tariácuri", and his sister was also singer-actress Amalia Mendoza.

Filmography

References

External links

1917 births
1978 deaths
Singers from Michoacán
Male actors from Michoacán
Mexican people of Basque descent
Mexican people of indigenous peoples descent
Ranchera singers
Golden Age of Mexican cinema
20th-century Mexican male actors
People from Huetamo
20th-century Mexican male singers